The 800 metres, or meters (US spelling), is a common track running event. It is the shortest commonly run middle-distance running event. The 800 metres is run over two laps of an outdoor (400-metre) track and has been an Olympic event since the first modern games in 1896. During the winter track season the event is usually run by completing four laps of an indoor 200-metre track.

The event was derived from the imperial measurement of a half mile (880 yards), a traditional English racing distance. 800m is 4.67m less than a half mile.

The event combines aerobic endurance with anaerobic conditioning and sprint speed, so the 800m athlete has to combine training for both.

Runners in this event are occasionally fast enough to also compete in the 400 metres but more commonly have enough endurance to 'double up' in the 1500m. Only Alberto Juantorena and Jarmila Kratochvílová have won major international titles at 400m and 800m.

Race tactics
The 800m is also known for its tactical racing. Because it is the shortest middle-distance event that has all the runners converge into one lane (after the first bend), positioning on the cut-in and the position of the pack is critical to the outcome of the race. Gaining a front position early in the race is often advantageous as there are occasionally trips when running in a pack. Olympic champions Dave Wottle, Kelly Holmes and others have defied that logic by running a more evenly paced race, lagging behind the pack and accelerating past the slowing early leaders. Often the winner of elite 800m races is not the fastest runner, but the athlete best positioned near the end of the race: an athlete directly behind another runner, has to switch to an outer lane to overtake, so has to run further—and might be blocked by a third runner alongside.

800 metre participants usually run a positive split, where the first lap is faster, but a negative split is occasionally run as a tactic. The current world record (by David Rudisha) was run with a positive split in the 2012 Olympics. Rudisha ran the first lap in 49.28 seconds and the second in 51.63 seconds. Theoretically, an even split is the most efficient running mode, but it is difficult to pace correctly.

Continental records
Updated 25 September 2021.

All-time top 25

Men (outdoor)
Correct as of August 2021.

Women (outdoor)
Correct as of August 2021.

Annulled marks
Yelena Soboleva (Russia) ran 1:54.85 in Kazan on 18 July 2007, but her performance was annulled due to doping offences.
Mariya Savinova (Russia) ran 1:55.87 in Tula on 5 July 2008, but her performance was annulled due to doping offences.

Men (indoor)
Correct as of February 2023.

Notes
Below is a list of other times equal or superior to 1:44.82:
Wilson Kipketer also ran 1:43.96 (1997) and 1:44.68 (2003).
Donavan Brazier also ran 1:44.22 (2020) and 1:44.41 (2019).
Yuriy Borzakovskiy also ran 1:44.34 (2003), 1:44.35 (2000), 1:44.49 (2001), and 1:44.58 (2004).

Women (indoor)
Correct as of February 2023.

Notes
Below is a list of other times equal or superior to 1:58.19:
Stephanie Graf also ran 1:56.85 (2002), 1:57.53 (2001), 1:57.61 (2002), 1:57.68 (2001), and 1:57.80 (2000).
Maria Mutola also ran 1:57.06 (1999), 1:57.13 (1996), 1:57.17 (1999), 1:57.48 (2002, 2004), 1:57.55 (1993), 1:57.62 (1995), 1:57.72 (2004), 1:57.90 (1998), 1:58.02 (1997, 2001), 1:58.05 (2001), and 1:58.16 (1999).
Jolanda Ceplak also ran 1:57.18 (2002) and 1:57.79 (2002).
Keely Hodgkinson also ran 1:57.20 (2022), 1:57.71 (2023), 1:57.87 (2023).

Juniors
World junior records (19 and under) are held by Nijel Amos (1:41.73, London, 9 August 2012) and Pamela Jelimo (1:54.01, Zürich, 29 August 2008). Both marks coincidentally rank them as the third fastest ever.

Olympic medalists

Men

Women

World Championships medalists

Men

Women

World Indoor Championships medalists

Men

Women

 Known as the World Indoor Games

Season's bests

Men

Women

References

External links
IAAF list of 800-metres records in XML

 
Events in track and field
Middle-distance running
Summer Olympic disciplines in athletics